Charcas may refer to:
 Charcas Province, a province in Potosí Department, Bolivia
 Real Audiencia of Charcas, one of six political units of the Viceroyalty of Peru
 Charcas, a historical name of Sucre, capital of Bolivia
 University of Saint Francis Xavier, also known as the University of Charcas
 Charca people, an Indian tribe that inhabited the Chuquisaca Department prior to the arrival of the Spaniards
 Charcas, San Luis Potosi, a town and municipality in San Luis Potosí state, Mexico
 Las Charcas, Azua, a town in the Azua Province of the Dominican Republic
 Charcas, Quebradillas, Puerto Rico , a barrio in Quebradillas, in Puerto Rico (U.S.)